Stępiński (feminine: Stępińska; plural: Stępińscy) is a Polish surname. Notable persons with the surname include:

 Mariusz Stępiński (born 1995), Polish footballer
 Miłosz Stępiński (born 1974), Polish football manager
 Patryk Stępiński (born 1995), Polish footballer

See also
 

Polish-language surnames